Zzyzx or Zyzzyx may refer to:

Arts and entertainment
 Zzyzx (Zeromancer album), 2003
 Zzyzx (Os Mutantes album), 2020
 Zzyzx (film), a 2006 film directed by Richard Halpern
 "Zzyzx Rd." (song), a 2007 song by Stone Sour from Come What(ever) May
 Zzyzx, a fictional underground research facility in the TV series Kyle XY
 Zzyzx, a fictional prison for demons in the novel series Fablehaven by Brandon Mull

Places
 Zzyzx, California, a place in the U.S., and Zzyzx Road, a road leading to it

Other uses
 Zyzzyx, a genus of sand wasp

See also
 Xyzzy (disambiguation)
 "Zzyzx Scarecrow", a song by Stavesacre from the 1997 album Absolutes
 Zyzyxia, a species of tropical shrub
 Zyzz, the persona that was used by Australian bodybuilder Aziz Shavershian
 Zzyzzyxx, a 1982 arcade game
 Captain Zzyzx, a novel by Michael Petracca
 Zyzzyx Road, a 2006 film directed by John Penney, famously earning $30 at the box-office.